Canobius (named for Canobie, the district where it was discovered) is an extinct genus of early ray-finned fish that lived in the Carboniferous period of Europe.

Canobius was a small fish,  in length. Compared with its earlier relatives, it had specialized jawbones and hyomandibulars which attached the upper jaw to the braincase, meaning that the jaws were hung vertically under the braincase. This allowed Canobius to open its jaws wider and expand its gill slits further at the same time. In turn, this meant that the fish could take in more oxygen, making it a more active creature. Canobius is presumed to have fed on plankton which is filtered from the water using its small teeth and gills.

References

Palaeonisciformes
Prehistoric bony fish genera
Carboniferous bony fish
Carboniferous fish of Europe